Samuel Cleeton Dallas (May 1, 1857 - October 3, 1920) was an American architect who designed many buildings in the state of Utah, including the NRHP-listed Alfred McCune Home and the Brooks Arcade with William S. Hedges. He also designed five buildings on the campus of the University of Utah.

References

1857 births
1920 deaths
University of Utah alumni
Architects from Salt Lake City
20th-century American architects
Burials at Salt Lake City Cemetery